Balmain, an electoral district of the Legislative Assembly in the Australian state of New South Wales, has had three incarnations since it was established in 1880. It expanded from 1 to 2 to 3 to 4 members before being abolished in 1894. It was re-established in 1904 returning 1 member until 1920.  When multiple member constituencies were established using the Hare-Clark single transferable vote in 1920, Balmain returned 5 members.  It had a single member from 1927 when the state returned to single member electorates. It was abolished in 1991 and largely replaced by Port Jackson which included the Sydney CBD. It was re-established in 2007 when Port Jackson was abolished.


Election results

Elections in the 2010s

2019

2015

2011

Elections in the 2000s

2007

1991 - 2007
District abolished

Elections in the 1980s

1988

1984

1981

Elections in the 1970s

1978

1976

1973

1971

Elections in the 1960s

1968

1965

1962

Elections in the 1950s

1959

1956

1953

1950

Elections in the 1940s

1947

1944

1941

Elections in the 1930s

1939 by-election

1938

1935

1932

1930

Elections in the 1920s

1927
This section is an excerpt from Results of the 1927 New South Wales state election § Balmain

1925
This section is an excerpt from Results of the 1925 New South Wales state election § Balmain

1922
This section is an excerpt from Results of the 1922 New South Wales state election § Balmain

1921 appointment
The Premier John Storey died on 5 October 1921. Between 1920 and 1927 the Legislative Assembly was elected using a form of proportional representation with multi-member seats and a single transferable vote (modified Hare-Clark). Under the provisions of the Parliamentary Elections (Casual Vacancies) Act, casual vacancies were filled by the next unsuccessful candidate on the incumbent member's party list. Tom Keegan was the only unsuccessful Labor candidate at the 1920 election and took his seat on 18 October 1921.

1920
This section is an excerpt from Results of the 1920 New South Wales state election § Balmain

Elections in the 1910s

1917
This section is an excerpt from Results of the 1917 New South Wales state election § Balmain

1913
This section is an excerpt from Results of the 1913 New South Wales state election § Balmain

1910
This section is an excerpt from Results of the 1910 New South Wales state election § Balmain

Elections in the 1900s

1907
This section is an excerpt from Results of the 1907 New South Wales state election § Balmain

1904
This section is an excerpt from Results of the 1904 New South Wales state election § Balmain

1894 - 1904
District abolished

1891
This section is an excerpt from Results of the 1891 New South Wales colonial election § Balmain

1890 by-election

Elections in the 1880s

1889
This section is an excerpt from Results of the 1889 New South Wales colonial election § Balmain

1887
This section is an excerpt from Results of the 1887 New South Wales colonial election § Balmain

1885
This section is an excerpt from Results of the 1885 New South Wales colonial election § Balmain

1882
This section is an excerpt from Results of the 1882 New South Wales colonial election § Balmain

1880
This section is an excerpt from Results of the 1880 New South Wales colonial election § Balmain

Notes

References 

New South Wales state electoral results by district